The North Fork Salmon River is a  river in Siskiyou County, California. It joins with the South Fork Salmon River at Forks of Salmon to form the Salmon River, a major tributary of the Klamath River. The entire river is located within the Klamath National Forest, with the headwaters located in the Marble Mountain Wilderness.

See also
List of rivers of California

References

Rivers of Siskiyou County, California
Wild and Scenic Rivers of the United States